Henry Vinberg was a Swedish footballer who played as a goalkeeper.

References

Association football goalkeepers
Swedish footballers
Allsvenskan players
Malmö FF players